Sunshine Plaza is a large regional shopping centre located in Maroochydore, Queensland, and is the largest shopping centre on the Sunshine Coast. Anchor tenants included in the centre are Coles, Woolworths, Myer, Kmart, Target, Big W, H&M, David Jones, and a 12-screen Birch Carroll & Coyle cinema. The centre is currently managed by Lendlease.

History
Previously operating under a different structure, the centre began trading in 1980 as The Sands Shopping Centre. The Lend Lease Corporation purchased the centre in 1990 and began redevelopment of the site. The new centre began trading in 1994 under the new name Sunshine Plaza. It contains approximately 62,000 square metres of floor space; increased by recent expansions in the early 2000s. The latest expansion (completed in 2002) included the addition of a Woolworths supermarket, a new leisure and restaurant precinct, and the expansion of the Birch Carroll & Coyle cinema complex.

In early 1999 it was announced that the Westfield Group would take a 25 percent stake in Sunshine plaza feet with clearance from the Australian Competition & Consumer Commission.  The General Property Trust wanted to sell its stake, but joint owners Lendlease (through APPF Retail) had argued that they had exercised their pre-emptive rights over the centre, which gave them the rights to buy any part that GPT wants to sell before anyone else could buy it.

In mid-2010, it was announced that David Jones was planning to open a two level store, after a development application was submitted to the Sunshine Coast Council in August.

Redevelopment 
In September 2016, the $400 million makeover commenced. The proposed plan continued west along Cornmeal Creek and included introducing retailing giant, David Jones into a two-storey site. On top of this there would be a further 1,400 car spaces, 100 more speciality retail and restaurant spaces and an expansion of the Myer department store. It was scheduled for completion by the end of 2018.

Grand Opening of Redevelopment 
In March 2019, the $440 million redevelopment opened to the public, including a one-level David Jones store, a two-level H&M, and a new concept Big W store. The redevelopment increased the total number of stores from 276 to 345, and increased the total number of parking spaces to nearly 5,000.

High Ropes course 
A High Ropes attraction was expected to be built by mid 2019, and be possibly the world's largest ropes course on poles. It opened in November 2020.

Tenants 
Sunshine Plaza contains 107,000 sqm of total floor space, and has 345 stores post redevelopment. Major retailers are Coles, Woolworths, Myer, Kmart, Target, Big W, David Jones, H&M, JB Hi-Fi, MECCA, Sephora, and Rebel. The plaza also has a 12-screen Birch Carroll & Coyle cinema.

See also 

 List of shopping centres in Australia

References

External links 
  Sunshine Coast Expansion Plans

Maroochydore
Shopping centres on the Sunshine Coast, Queensland
Shopping malls established in 1994
1994 establishments in Australia